Leucopeonidin is a leucoanthocyanidin.

A leucopeonidin glycoside is found in the bark of Ficus bengalensis.

References

Leucoanthocyanidins
Phenol ethers
Resorcinols